University Gardens (also known as Lakeville) is a hamlet and a census-designated place (CDP) in Nassau County, on the North Shore of Long Island, in New York, United States. It is located within the Town of North Hempstead and is part of the Greater Great Neck area. The population was 4,358 at the time of the 2020 census.

The University Gardens CDP includes the University Gardens subdivision and the other unincorporated areas between it and the Nassau/Queens line, including Great Neck Terrace.

History 
The University Gardens subdivision within the greater, eponymous CDP is a distinct community founded in 1927 and operates under a set of covenants recorded with its 218 homes and 17 commercial properties under the auspices of the University Gardens Property Owners Association, Inc.; it is located in the northeastern portion of the CDP.

The name of the CDP, which as aforementioned is named for the smaller, eponymous subdivision, derives from the fact that the land which the subdivision is located on was purchased from and built atop the short-lived University Golf Club, and because Russell Gardens, located across Northern Boulevard, was being developed around the same time. 

As such, the "University" part of its name comes from the golf club and the "Gardens" part of its name comes from Russell Gardens.

Geography

Demographics

Census 2000 
As of Census 2000, there were 4,138 people, 1,660 households, and 1,160 families residing in the CDP. The population density was 7,007.1 per square mile (2,708.0/km2). There were 1,696 housing units at an average density of 2,871.9/sq mi (1,109.9/km2). The racial makeup of the CDP was 80.67% White, 2.39% African American, 0.12% Native American, 13.29% Asian, 1.98% from other races, and 1.55% from two or more races. Hispanic or Latino of any race were 7.59% of the population.

There were 1,660 households, out of which 31.2% had children under the age of 18 living with them, 58.6% were married couples living together, 8.8% had a female householder with no husband present, and 30.1% were non-families. 27.3% of all households were made up of individuals, and 9.0% had someone living alone who was 65 years of age or older. The average household size was 2.49 and the average family size was 3.06.

In the CDP, the population was spread out, with 22.7% under the age of 18, 5.3% from 18 to 24, 28.3% from 25 to 44, 28.3% from 45 to 64, and 15.3% who were 65 years of age or older. The median age was 42 years. For every 100 females, there were 88.9 males. For every 100 females age 18 and over, there were 86.6 males.

The median income for a household in the CDP was $74,637, and the median income for a family was $90,511. Males had a median income of $61,207 versus $42,308 for females. The per capita income for the CDP was $40,643. About 2.5% of families and 2.4% of the population were below the poverty line, including 3.1% of those under age 18 and 2.1% of those age 65 or over.

2010 Census 
As of the 2010 United States Census, there were 3,058 people, 1,559 households, and 1,106 families within the CDP. The racial makeup of the CDP was 76.7% White, 3.0% African American, 0.0% Native American, 20.0% Asian, 0.0% Native Hawaiian and Other Pacific Islander, 1.2% from other races, and 0.9% from two or more races. Hispanic or Latino of any race were 2.5% of the population.

Parks and recreation 
The University Gardens Property Owners Association owns and maintains a neighborhood club on Sussex Road within the University Gardens subdivision, called the University Gardens Pool & Tennis Club. It is open exclusively to residents of the subdivision and their guests.

The Great Neck Park District, which the hamlet is entirely within the boundaries of, also maintains Lakeville Park, which is located at the northern end of Concord Avenue at Pembroke Avenue.

Government

Town representation 
As University Gardens is an unincorporated hamlet, it has no government of its own, and is instead governed directly by the Town of North Hempstead in Manhasset.

University Gardens is located in the Town of North Hempstead's 5th council district, which as of December 2022 is represented on the North Hempstead Town Council by David A. Adhami (R–Great Neck).

Representation in higher government

Nassau County representation 
University Gardens is located in Nassau County's 10th Legislative district, which as of December 2022 is represented in the Nassau County Legislature by Mazi Melesa Pilip (R–Great Neck).

New York State representation

New York State Assembly 
University Gardens is located in the New York State Assembly's 16th State Assembly district, which as of December 2022 is represented in the New York State Assembly by Gina Sillitti (D–Manorhaven).

New York State Senate 
University Gardens is located in the New York State Senate's 7th State Senate district, which as of December 2022 is represented in the New York State Senate by Anna Kaplan (D–North Hills).

Federal representation

United States Congress 
University Gardens is located in New York's 3rd congressional district, which as of December 2022 is represented in the United States Congress by Thomas Suozzi (D–Glen Cove).

United States Senate 
Like the rest of New York, University Gardens is represented in the United States Senate by Charles Schumer (D) and Kirsten Gillibrand (D).

Politics 
In the 2016 U.S. presidential election, the majority of University Gardens voters voted for Hillary Clinton (D).

Education

School district 
University Gardens is located entirely within the boundaries of the Great Neck Union Free School District. As such, all children who reside within University Gardens and attend public schools go to Great Neck's schools.

Library district 
University Gardens is located within the boundaries of the Great Neck Library District.

Infrastructure

Transportation

Road 
Northern Boulevard (New York State Route 25A) passes through the hamlet and forms part of its northern boundary. Additionally, the Long Island Expressway (Interstate 495) forms a small portion of the hamlet's southwestern boundary.

Other major roads include Bates Road, Great Neck Road, Horrace Harding Boulevard, Middle Neck Road, and Nassau Boulevard.

Rail 
Although the Long Island Rail Road's Port Washington Branch passes through University Gardens and forms part of its northwestern boundary, there are no stations located within the hamlet. The nearest Long Island Rail Road stations to University Gardens are Great Neck and Little Neck.

Bus 

The n20G bus route travels along Northern Boulevard and Middle Neck Road through University Gardens. This bus line is operated by Nassau Inter-County Express (NICE). Additionally, NICE's n20h, n21, n25, and n26 bus routes run through a small section of the northwestern portion of the hamlet, along Middle Neck Road.

Utilities

Natural gas 
National Grid USA provides natural gas to homes and businesses that are hooked up to natural gas lines in University Gardens.

Power 
PSEG Long Island provides power to all homes and businesses within University Gardens.

Sewage 
University Gardens is connected to sanitary sewers. These sewers are operated by the Belgrave Sewer District, which the hamlet, in its entirety, is located within the boundaries of.

Water 
University Gardens is located entirely within the boundaries of (and is thus served by) the Manhasset–Lakeville Water District.

References

External links 

 University Gardens Property Owners Association, Inc. website

Census-designated places in New York (state)
Great Neck Peninsula
Hamlets in New York (state)
Census-designated places in Nassau County, New York
Hamlets in Nassau County, New York